The Chaco tree frog (Boana raniceps)  is a frog species in the family Hylidae found in Argentina, Bolivia, Brazil, Colombia, French Guiana, Paraguay, and Venezuela. 

Its natural habitats are subtropical or tropical dry forests, subtropical or tropical moist lowland forests, subtropical or tropical dry lowland grassland, rivers, swamps, freshwater lakes, intermittent freshwater lakes, freshwater marshes, intermittent freshwater marshes, urban areas, and heavily degraded former forests.

References

Boana
Amphibians of Argentina
Amphibians of Bolivia
Amphibians of Brazil
Amphibians of Colombia
Amphibians of French Guiana
Amphibians of Paraguay
Amphibians of Venezuela
Amphibians described in 1862
Taxonomy articles created by Polbot